Eric Jones (May 27, 1971 – September 10, 2022) was an American comic book artist.

Biography
Eric Jones was the artist and co-creator of a number of comic books and had worked for companies such as Disney, DC Comics and Image Comics. Additionally, he was the co-creator of the internationally broadcast cartoon series called Scary Larry.

Bibliography

Comics
Comics work includes:
 Filthy Habits #1-5 (1994–1996, Aeon Comics)
 X-Ray Comics #1-3 (1997–1998, Slave Labor Graphics):
 X-Ray Comics Volume 1: Filth (SLG Publishing, 2004)
 X-Ray Comics Volume 2: Swine (SLG Publishing, 2004)
 Comic Zone 4: Kid Gravity (Disney Press, 2005)
 Little Gloomy #1-6 (1999–2001, Slave Labor Graphics, tpb, Little Gloomy: It was a Dark and Stormy Night, SLG Publishing, 2002)
 The Super Scary Monster Show featuring Little Gloomy #1-3 (2005–2006, Slave Labor Graphics, tpb, 2008)
 Tron: The Ghost in the Machine #1-6 (2006–2008, Slave Labor Graphics, tpb, 2009)
 Supergirl: Cosmic Adventures in the Eighth Grade #1-6 (2008-2009 DC Comics, tpb, 2009)
 Batman: The Brave and the Bold: The Fearsome Fangs Strike Again (DC Comics, tpb, 2011)
 Batman: The Brave and the Bold: Emerald Knight (DC Comics, tpb, 2012)
 Danger Club Volume 1: Death (Image Comics, tpb, 2012 )
 Danger Club Volume 2: Rebirth (Image Comics, tpb, 2015 )
 The Infinite Adventures of Supernova Volume 1: Pepper Page Saves the Universe! (First Second Books, OGN, 2021 )

References

1971 births
2022 deaths
American comics artists